Save My Lost Nigga Soul is a 1993 Canadian short film, directed by Clement Virgo. An adaptation of the story of Cain and Abel, it was made while Virgo was a student at the Canadian Film Centre.

The film is story about two Black Canadian brothers who live together but do not see eye to eye because one is a drug addict. Meanwhile their roommate, an aspiring stand-up comedian, is planning to use material about their disputes in his forthcoming performance debut.

Virgo's later feature film Love Come Down was an expansion on the themes of Save My Lost Nigga Soul.

Achievements and awards
The short film won the Toronto International Film Festival Award for Best Canadian Short Film at the 1993 Toronto International Film Festival, and was nominated for the Genie Award for Best Theatrical Short Film at the 15th Genie Awards.

References

External links
 

1993 films
1993 drama films
Films directed by Clement Virgo
Hood films
Canadian Film Centre films
1990s English-language films
Canadian drama short films
1990s Canadian films